The Gisborne Football Netball Club, nicknamed the Bulldogs, is an Australian rules football and netball club located in the town of Gisborne, Victoria. 

The club teams currently compete in the Bendigo Football Netball League.

Premierships
 Riddell District Football League (11):
 1934, 1962, 1965, 1967, 1972, 1975, 1978, 1979, 1997, 1998, 1999
 Bendigo Football League (4):
 2002, 2003, 2005, 2006, 2022

Notable players
Alex Gardiner (Footscray wingman of the 1950s and 1960s)
Aaron James (AFL footballer who was a member of Gisborne's 2002 premiership team)
Gareth John (Sydney Swans and North Melbourne ruckman)
Michael Werner (AFL footballer who kicked 173 goals for Gisborne in 1997)
Bruce Hay (RDFL played in over 300 games and a member in four Premiership teams in the 1970s and 80's)

References

External links
 Official website

Australian rules football clubs in Victoria (Australia)
Sports clubs established in 1879
Australian rules football clubs established in 1879
1879 establishments in Australia
Netball teams in Victoria (Australia)
Bendigo Football League clubs